Fernando Gomes is a Bissau-Guinean politician who was the former interior minister of Guinea-Bissau. He was replaced after the 2012 Guinea-Bissau coup d'état.

References

Government ministers of Guinea-Bissau
Interior ministers of Guinea-Bissau
Living people
Year of birth missing (living people)
Place of birth missing (living people)